New Zealand political leader David Lange assembled a shadow cabinet system amongst the Labour caucus following his election to the position of Leader of the Opposition in 1983. He composed this of individuals who acted for the party as spokespeople in assigned roles while he was leader (1983–84).

As the Labour Party formed the largest party not in government, the frontbench team was as a result the Official Opposition of the New Zealand House of Representatives.

Frontbench team
Lange allocated portfolios on 16 March to caucus, but withheld any rankings. Lange announced the rankings at the beginning of April when the parliamentary session began for the year.

The list below contains a list of Lange's spokespeople and their respective roles:

Notes

References

New Zealand Labour Party
Lange, David
1983 establishments in New Zealand
1984 disestablishments in New Zealand